The 2021 Southern Conference softball tournament was held at the UNCG Softball Stadium on the campus of the University of North Carolina at Greensboro in Greensboro, North Carolina, from May 13 through May 15, 2021. The tournament was won by the UNC Greensboro Spartans, who earned the Southern Conference's automatic bid to the 2021 NCAA Division I softball tournament

Tournament

Bracket

References

Southern Conference softball tournament
Southern Conference softball tournament